Cambodia competed at the 2020 Summer Olympics in Tokyo. Originally scheduled to take place from 24 July to 9 August 2020, the Games were postponed to 23 July to 8 August 2021, due to the COVID-19 pandemic. This was the nation's seventh consecutive appearance at the Summer Olympics in the post-Soviet era.

Competitors
The following is the list of number of competitors in the Games.

Athletics

Cambodia received universality slots from IAAF to send one athletes to the Olympics.

Track & road events

Swimming

Cambodia received a universality invitation from FINA to send two top-ranked swimmers (one per gender) in their respective individual events to the Olympics, based on the FINA Points System of June 28, 2021.

References

Olympics
Nations at the 2020 Summer Olympics
2020